Night Train is a four-hour-long, weekly radio program originating from public radio station WLRN-FM in Miami, Florida.  It has aired continuously since 1977 and been hosted by Ted Grossman since its debut.  Each broadcast features an eclectic mix of jazz, Big Band, and blues recordings dating from the '30s to the present.

Format
The show airs live on Sunday nights from 8:00 to midnight EST.  It is simulcast live to the Florida Keys on WLRN's affiliate, WKWM.

Jimmy Forrest's 1951 instrumental jazz standard "Night Train" serves as the show's eponymous opening and closing theme music.

Occasionally, the show will feature local or nationally-known recording artists or other musicians as in-studio guests, with Grossman playing recordings and quizzing his guest about the identity of the recording's performer(s) or vocalist(s).

The last hour of the show typically features a music segment titled "Jazz Can Be Beautiful."  

Many shows are built around a theme featuring the recordings of a particular jazz performer (example:  Duke Ellington) or vocalist (example:  Frank Sinatra), or around a holiday, such as Halloween or Christmas.

In keeping with the show's locomotive-themed title, Grossman is known for donning a train conductor's striped railroad hat as he broadcasts each week. The Miami Herald once described the show as a "rambling, rumbling three-hour local service with stops at Big Band, Dixieland, The Blues and Crooner City."

In its early years (in the late 1970s), the show aired on Friday nights from 11 p.m. to 2 a.m.

Host
Ted Grossman has hosted the show since its debut in January 1977.  In addition to playing the recordings on his show, Grossman supplies anecdotes and authoritative commentary about the bands and performers, including album notes and assorted trivia.  He often peppers his show with mentions of the birthdays, deaths, or other anniversaries of jazz notables, past and present.

References

External links
 Night Train webpage at WLRN-FM
 Ted Grossman webpage at WLRN-FM
 Brief excerpt of Ted Grossman on-air during a Night Train broadcast (by Paul Leary)

American music radio programs
American jazz radio programs